Hell Bent for Letters is the second full-length album by the Seattle, Washington-based literary-metal band BlöödHag. It is their first release for Jello Biafra's Alternative Tentacles label. It was produced and recorded by the band's guitarist, Dr. J.M. McNulty, under his less formal name of Jeff McNulty.

The album title is a pun on the Judas Priest album Hell Bent for Leather. One reviewer described the album by suggesting, "[i]magine history class taught by GWAR, and it's still not quite enough to capture the essence of what BlöödHag bring to the table."

As with their past back catalog, all of the songs on Hell Bent for Letters honor various science fiction and similar genre writers, including Douglas Adams, Edgar Allan Poe, and Franz Kafka.

Track listing
"Gene Wolfe"
"Robert Silverberg"
"Douglas Adams"
"James Blish"
"Anne McCaffrey"
"Orson Scott Card"
"Iain M. Banks"
"Edgar Allan Poe"
"Philip Jose Farmer"
"Michael Swanwick"
"Frederik Pohl"
"Thomas M. Disch"
"Greg Bear"
"Franz Kafka"
"Madeleine L'Engle"
"Jack Womack"

Personnel
Prof. J.B. Stratton - vocals
Sir Zachary Orgel - bass
Dr. J.M. McNulty - guitars, "additional sounds" (as Jeff McNulty)
Amb. Brent Carpenter - drums
Jeremy Enigk - keyboards

Production
Jeff McNulty - producer, engineer
Eric Carnell - assistant engineer
Jon Ervie - assistant engineer
"Greedy" Greg Williamson - mix engineer

References and footnotes

BlöödHag albums
Alternative Tentacles albums
2006 albums
Music based on science fiction works